Alfred Meister (born 26 September 1942) is a Swiss rower. He competed in the men's coxless four event at the 1968 Summer Olympics.

References

External links
 
 

1942 births
Living people
Swiss male rowers
Olympic rowers of Switzerland
Rowers at the 1968 Summer Olympics
People from Schaffhausen
Sportspeople from the canton of Schaffhausen